Samuel Casey Wood (December 27, 1830 – April 11, 1913) was a Canadian businessman and politician, who served as a member of the Legislative Assembly of Ontario from 1871 to 1883, representing the electoral district of Victoria South as a Liberal member. Wood served as provincial treasurer from 1877 to 1883.

He was born in Bath in Upper Canada in 1830. He received a teaching certificate and taught at several schools. Around 1856, he opened a store in Victoria County. He served as county clerk and treasurer from 1860 to 1876. He elected to the provincial legislature in 1871.  In 1875, he was named provincial secretary and commissioner of agriculture and, in 1877, became provincial treasurer as well as commissioner of agriculture. He retired from politics in 1883.

He died in Toronto on April 11, 1913.

His brother Alpheus Field Wood also served as a member of the Ontario assembly.

References

External links

The Canadian portrait gallery, JC Dent (1881)

1830 births
1913 deaths
Ontario Liberal Party MPPs
Finance ministers of Ontario
Members of the Executive Council of Ontario
Provincial Secretaries of Ontario